A federal territory is an administrative division under the direct and usually exclusive jurisdiction of a federation's national government. A federal territory is a part of a federation, but not a part of any federated state. The states constitute the federation itself and share sovereignty with the federal government, while a territory does not have sovereign status and is constitutionally dependent on the federal government.

Unlike a federal district (which is directly controlled by the federal government), a territory may have some degree of self-rule, but the terms are used somewhat differently in different federations.

Federal territories in various federations 
Federal territories include:

  Australia
  (external)
  (claimed)
  (internal)
  (external)
  (external)
  (external)
  (external)
  (internal)
  (external)
  (internal)

  Canada
 
 
 

  India
 Andaman and Nicobar Islands
 Chandigarh
 Dadra and Nagar Haveli and Daman and Diu
 Delhi
 Jammu and Kashmir
 Ladakh
 Lakshadweep
 Puducherry

  Malaysia
 
 
 

  Nigeria
 Federal Capital Territory

  Pakistan
 

  United States
  (unincorporated unorganized)
  Bajo Nuevo Bank (claimed)
  (unincorporated unorganized)
  (unincorporated organized)
  (unincorporated unorganized)
  (unincorporated unorganized)
  (unincorporated unorganized)
  (unincorporated unorganized)
  (unincorporated unorganized)
  (unincorporated unorganized)
  (unincorporated organized)
  (incorporated unorganized)
  (unincorporated organized)
  Serranilla Bank (claimed)
  (unincorporated organized)
  (unincorporated unorganized)

Historical federal territories

Brazil 
In Brazil, although mentioned in the Federal Constitution, currently there are no federal territories. Until 1988, there were three territories: Fernando de Noronha (today a municipality of Pernambuco), Amapá, and Roraima, now fully recognised states. From 1943 to 1982 Rondônia was also a federal territory (until 1956 under the name of Território do Guaporé).

Canada 
The Northwest Territories used to include a majority of what is now Canada, and was divided into districts for ease of administration from 1882 until 1999. One such district, Keewatin, was its own federal territory from 1876 until 1905.

Germany 

The German Empire was a federation of monarchies and a few city-states. However, after the Franco-Prussian War, the newly created country annexed large parts of Alsace and Lorraine, two mostly German-speaking French territories which used to belong to the Holy Roman Empire. A large part of the local population was opposed to the transfer, meaning that granting statehood to the recently acquired territory would establish a state with a possible desire for secession which also was not used to German politics and German law. Incorporating the territory into Prussia, as happened to Schleswig-Holstein and other states during the German Unification Wars, was opposed by the South German states which already felt diminished by Prussia. Hence, an annexation to Bavaria and Baden was also discussed, yet met with opposition by the military which opined that the crucial border territory had to be governed from Berlin. As a compromise, Otto von Bismarck successfully proposed to incorporate Alsace-Lorraine as a territory directly governed by the Imperial (federal) government, leading to the creation of the Imperial Territory of Alsace-Lorraine (Reichsland Elsaß-Lothringen). The territorial status, common in the US, was unique within mainland Germany, as all constituent states were self-governing. In 1911 the Constitution of the German Empire was amended to treat Alsace-Lorraine as a state for certain matters, including its own government and votes in the Bundestag.

France annexed the complete area after World War I. Since then, the German national government never had direct control over a German territory, with the exception of the Nazi government; however, Nazi Germany was - like East Germany - a centralized state where state governments were de facto abolished. The Federal Republic of Germany's Basic Law does not currently provide a legal way to create a federal territory, including a capital district, and describes the German national territory as being composed solely of states.

Mexico

United States 
In the United States, many of the states were territories or parts of territories before reaching statehood, e.g. Louisiana Territory, Mississippi Territory, Oregon Territory, Alaska Territory and Hawaii Territory. Before reaching statehood, these territories of the United States were formally usually of a kind which can be described as "organized incorporated territories", meaning that the government of the jurisdiction was formally organized in such a way as to comply with recognized federal standards for self-government, and that the jurisdiction was "organic" to the United States, that is, an irrevocably inseverable part of it rather than a protectorate, an area leased from and still pertaining formally to another nation, or a concession granted by another nation or group which conceivably could retain certain rights to it.  "Incorporated" territories are a part of the United States, though not of any particular constituent state, and as are not readily saleable or cessionable to other powers in the way that "unincorporated" territories are.

Notes

References 

Territories
Types of administrative division